Jarkko Niemi (born 30 October 1984, in Tuusula) is a Finnish actor.

Selected filmography

Young Gods (2003)
Glass Jaw (2004)
Game Over (2005)
Kamome Shokudo (2006)
One Foot Under (2009)
Forbidden Fruit (2009)
Let My People Go! (2011)
Risto (2011)
Ja saapuu oikea yö (2012)
21 tapaa pilata avioliitto (2013)
Nymphs (2014)

References

External links

1984 births
Living people
People from Tuusula
Finnish male film actors